The Central District of Qir and Karzin County is a district (bakhsh) in Qir and Karzin County, Fars Province, Iran. At the 2006 census, its population was 47,392, in 10,280 families.  The District has two cities: Qir and Karzin. The District has three rural districts (dehestan): Fathabad Rural District, Hangam Rural District, and Mobarakabad Rural District.

References 

Qir and Karzin County
Districts of Fars Province